Anyone Lived in a Pretty How Town (stylized as anyone lived in a pretty [how] town) is a 1967 short film made by George Lucas inspired by E. E. Cummings' poem of the same name.

It was one of two films Lucas made after returning to USC's film school as a graduate in 1967 (the other was The Emperor). The film represented a first for the USC film school by being shot in color and widescreen.

The film was shown out of competition in the Special Screening section at the Short Shorts Film Festival EXPO 2005.

Premise
The film focuses on the life cycle of a townspeople, and a photographer who takes pictures of one ignored young couple.

See also
List of American films of 1967

References

External links
 

Short films directed by George Lucas
1967 films
American short films
Films without speech
E. E. Cummings
Films based on poems
American student films
1967 short films
1960s English-language films